Matthew Joseph Ravlich (born July 12, 1938) is a Canadian retired ice hockey defenceman. He played in the National Hockey League for four teams between and 1962 and 1972.

Playing career
Ravlich started his National Hockey League career with the Boston Bruins. He also played with the Detroit Red Wings, Chicago Black Hawks and Los Angeles Kings. His career lasted from 1962 to 1972.

Career statistics

Regular season and playoffs

External links
 

1938 births
Living people
Boston Braves (AHL) players
Boston Bruins players
Buffalo Bisons (AHL) players
Canadian ice hockey defencemen
Chicago Blackhawks players
Dallas Black Hawks players
Detroit Red Wings players
Galt Black Hawks players
Ice hockey people from Ontario
Los Angeles Kings players
Providence Reds players
Sault Thunderbirds players
Seattle Totems (WHL) players
Sportspeople from Sault Ste. Marie, Ontario